The 1980 Monte Carlo Open was a men's tennis tournament played on outdoor clay courts at the Monte Carlo Country Club in Roquebrune-Cap-Martin, France that was part of the 1980 Volvo Grand Prix circuit. It was the 74th edition of the tournament and was held from 31 March through 6 April 1980. First-seeded Björn Borg won the singles title, his third after 1977 and 1979.

Finals

Singles
 Björn Borg defeated  Guillermo Vilas 6–1, 6–0, 6–2
 It was Borg's 4th singles title of the year and the 56th of his career.

Doubles
 Paolo Bertolucci /  Adriano Panatta defeated  Vitas Gerulaitis /  John McEnroe 6–2, 5–7, 6–3

References

External links
 
 ATP tournament profile
 ITF tournament edition details

Monte Carlo Open
Monte-Carlo Masters
Monte Carlo Open
Monte Carlo Open
Monte Carlo Open
Monte